Coleophora nepetae is a moth of the family Coleophoridae. It is found in Afghanistan.

The larvae feed on Nepeta honigbergeri. They feed on the leaves of their host plant.

References

nepetae
Moths described in 1994
Moths of Asia